Gopalganj Subdivision is one of two subdivisions in the Gopalganj district or India, among the 101 subdivisions of Bihar. It comprises seven blocks of the Gopalganj district.

Community development blocks of Gopalganj Subdivision

References

Subdivisions of Bihar